Junot is a French name that may refer to the following notable people:
Given name
Junot Díaz (born 1968), Dominican American

Surname
Laure Junot, Duchess of Abrantes (1784–1838), French writer
Jean-Andoche Junot, 1st Duke of Abrantès (1771–1813), French general during the Revolutionary and Napoleonic Wars
Mara Junot, American voiceover actress
Philippe Junot (born 1940), venture capitalist and property developer

See also 
 Juno (disambiguation)

Surnames of French origin